John Ray (March 25, 1937 – January 27, 2020) was an American stock car racing driver. The father of Kevin Ray, he was a competitor in the NASCAR Winston Cup Series.

Career
Ray began his career at the top level of NASCAR competition, the Winston Cup Series (now the NASCAR Monster Energy Cup Series) in 1974, making his debut at Alabama International Motor Speedway (now Talladega Superspeedway); he finished 41st of 50 cars in the event. He went on to race seven more times in the series between 1974 and 1976; his best finish came at Talladega later in 1974, when he finished 22nd. In 1975, Ray, a trucker by profession, set a world speed record for semi-trailer trucks, at Talladega.

Accident
Ray entered the 1976 season planning to compete for Rookie of the Year honors in the Winston Cup Series. Competing in the 1976 Daytona 500, the second race of the season, Ray crashed on the 112th lap, skidding in oil before being hit by Skip Manning. Extricated from his wrecked Chevrolet, Ray was taken to Halifax Medical Center, where he was found to have no vital signs and was initially declared dead; last-ditch resuscitation efforts managed to revive Ray. While he survived the accident, and competed in some local events in Alabama over the next few years, he never participated in NASCAR competition as a driver again.

Post-accident career
Following his recovery, Ray went on to own cars driven by Dale Earnhardt, Johnny Rutherford, and Chuck Bown during the late 1970s; he also owned a team in the 1990s for his son, Kevin Ray, competing on a limited basis in the NASCAR Busch Series and the ARCA Bondo/Mar-Hyde Supercar Series.

Ray, wife Kay, and son John Jnr own John Ray Enterprises LLC, a trucking company established in 1991, after originally starting in 1972 and selling in 1988, the family reacquired the company in 1991 after the new owners went bankrupt. After the September 11, 2001 terrorist attacks, the Ray family began driving one of the John Ray Enterprises tractor-trailers around Talladega Superspeedway before the track's Cup races.

Motorsports career results

NASCAR
(key) (Bold – Pole position awarded by qualifying time. Italics – Pole position earned by points standings or practice time. * – Most laps led.)

Winston Cup Series

References

External links
 
 

1937 births
2020 deaths
People from Eastaboga, Alabama
Racing drivers from Alabama
Place of death missing
NASCAR drivers
NASCAR team owners
American truck drivers